Kapashera Border is one of the main Borders of Delhi. It connects Delhi to Gurugram district of Haryana state. The road connecting two said cities is referred to as Old Delhi-Gurgaon Road.

Bus Routes from Kapashera(Row 1)  
One can avail the following buses from Kapashera border bus terminal----(Row1)

 To New Delhi metro station via Dhaula Kuan (Bus No: 729)
 To Dwarka & Uttam Nagar
 To Safdurjung Hospital
 To Karol Bagh
 To Badarpur
 To Najafgarh
 To Ghazipur

List of Some Main Borders and it's Proximity to Nearest Area in Delhi 

Singhu Border
Jhatikara Border 
Auchandi Border 
Ghazipur Border 
Badarpur Border 
Kapashera Border 
Kalindi Kunj Border
Shahdara Border
Arjan Garh Border
List of Main Borders of NCT --- Nearest Areas in Delhi---(Row2)
Singhu Border(Delhi-Haryana)- Singhu, Narela
Jhatikara Border(Delhi-Haryana)- Jhatikara Village
Auchandi Border(Delhi-Haryana)- Auchandi Village, Bawana
Ghazipur Border(Delhi-UP)- Ghazipur Village, Mayur Vihar
Badarpur border(Delhi-Haryana)- Badarpur Village, Badarpur Border area near Toll Plaza
Kapashera Border(Delhi-Haryana)- Kapashera Village, Samalkha
Kalindi Kunj(Delhi-UP)- Shaheen Bagh, okhla Village
Shahdara or Apsara Border(Delhi-UP)- Dilshad Garden, Shahdara
Arjan Garh Border(Delhi-Haryana)- Arjangarh, Ghitroni

References 

Neighbourhoods in Delhi